Peter James Reginald Fish CB is a former senior British government lawyer, who served from April 2014 to 2021 as the Director-General for Legal affairs at the Home Office. In each of his most recent three postings since 2009 he has immediately followed Jonathan Guy Jones, who now serves as HM Procurator General and Treasury Solicitor; first as the Director-General of the Attorney General's Office, then as Deputy Treasury Solicitor, and now at the Home Office.

Fish was appointed Companion of the Order of the Bath (CB) in the 2017 New Year Honours.

References 

Living people
Civil servants in the Home Office
Civil servants in the Attorney General's Office (United Kingdom)
Civil servants in the Treasury Solicitor's Department
Companions of the Order of the Bath
Year of birth missing (living people)